Giovanni Serafino Volta (1764–1842) was an Italian priest, naturalist, and palaeontologist, best known for his studies of fossil fish from Monte Bolca.

Volta was an Abate (or abbot) and theologian. He was a Canon of the Imperial Basilica in Mantua and the curator of the natural history department at the University of Pavia.

He wrote Ittiolitologia Veronese del Museo Bozziano ora annesso a quello del Conte Giovambattista Gazola e di altri gabinetti di fossili Veronesi con la versione Latina, published at Verona between 1796 and 1809. Illustrated with 76 fine plates this is the first treatise on fossil ichthyology in Italy and describes 123 species of fossil fish from the fossil site of Monte Bolca.

With Louis Agassiz he also wrote Revue critique des poissons fossiles figurés dans l'Ittiolitologia veronesé (Neuchatel, 1835).

Most other widely known works include:

Elementi di Mineralogia Analitica e Sistematica   Manimi, 1787
Prospetto Del Museo Bellisomiano, classificato e compendiosamente descritto (1787). 
 
Chemisch-mineralischer Versuch über die Bäder und Gebürge von Baaden
Saggio analitico sulle acque minerali di S. Colombano
Dei Pesci fossili del Veronese, lettera indirizzata al signor abate don Domenico Testa
Osservazioni di storia naturale sul viaggio da Fiorenzola a Velleja
Transunto di osservazioni sopra il lago di Garda ed i suoi contorni 
Osservazioni botanico-zoologiche e agrarie sul Riso sativo e lo Scarabeo fruticola
Lettera sopra alcune sperienze riguardanti il sessualismo dei vegetabili del Sig Canonico Don Giovanni Serafino Volta al Sig Luigi Brugnatelli Biblioteca Fisica d'Europa, Vol. 7

See also
Blochius longirostris an Eocene fish described by Volta.
Dasyatis muricata an Eocene stingray described by Volta.

References

External links
National Library of Australia
Mineral Record
Kálmán Lambrecht, Werner Quenstedt, A. Quenstedt, 1938 Palaeontologi Catalogus bio-bibliographicus, 1938: 447.Arno Press, 1938

Italian paleontologists
1764 births
1842 deaths